Myriane Houplain (born 5 June 1946) is a French politician. Houplain became the Member of Parliament for Pas-de-Calais's 10th constituency in 2021.

Career 
In the 2017 French legislative election, Houplain was the substitute for Ludovic Pajot. She replaced Pajot as a MP after he was elected mayor of Bruay-la-Buissière.

She left the National Rally in 2022. She sought re-election in the 2022 French legislative election under the Reconquête banner. She was eliminated in the first round, losing her seat. The seat was won by National Rally candidate Thierry Frappé in the second round.

Personal life 
Houplin lives in Beuvry.

References

See also 

 List of deputies of the 15th National Assembly of France

Living people
1946 births
People from Pas-de-Calais
Women members of the National Assembly (France)
21st-century French politicians
21st-century French women politicians
Deputies of the 15th National Assembly of the French Fifth Republic
Members of Parliament for Pas-de-Calais
Reconquête politicians

National Rally (France) politicians